The 2016 Russell Athletic Bowl was a post-season American college football bowl game played on December 28, 2016 at the Camping World Stadium in Orlando, Florida. The 27th edition of the Russell Athletic Bowl featured the West Virginia Mountaineers of the Big 12 Conference against the Miami Hurricanes of the Atlantic Coast Conference. It was one of the 2016–17 bowl games that concluded the 2016 FBS football season.  The game's naming rights sponsor is the Russell Athletic uniform company.

Teams
The game featured tie-ins from the Atlantic Coast Conference and the Big 12 Conference.

West Virginia Mountaineers

Miami Hurricanes

Game summary

Scoring summary

References

2016–17 NCAA football bowl games
2016
2016 Russell Athletic Bowl
2016 Russell Athletic Bowl
December 2016 sports events in the United States
2016 in sports in Florida
2010s in Orlando, Florida